The Birmingham Blitz were a semi-professional basketball team that plays in the American Basketball Association (ABA) based in Birmingham, Alabama. Founded in 2011, the team was owned by Birmingham Blitz LLC and in part by professional basketball player Ronald Steele. The Blitz played their home games at Bill Harris Arena. The team played their inaugural game on November 16, 2012 against the Southwest Fellowship Warriors, a substitute team for the Tampa Bay Rain who folded before the season started.

The Blitz are the second ABA franchise to be based in Birmingham. The Birmingham Magicians last played in the league in 2006. An unrelated ABA team based in Birmingham named the Magic City Blitz was formed in 2017.

See also
Birmingham Sabers
Birmingham Steel (basketball)

References

External links
Official website

Birmingham Blitz at ABALive.com

Defunct American Basketball Association (2000–present) teams
Basketball teams in Alabama
Sports teams in Birmingham, Alabama
Basketball teams established in 2011